Seminal, ultimately from Latin semen, "seed", may refer to:
Relating to seeds
Relating to semen
(Of a work, event, or person) Having much social influence on later developments